Christian German School Chiang Mai (CDSC;) is a German international school in Chiang Mai, Thailand.

It serves from nursery to secondary stage II.

The current nursery building opened in June 2013.

References

External links
 Christian German School Chiang Mai
 Christian German School Chiang Mai 

German international schools in Thailand
International schools in Chiang Mai
Private schools in Thailand
Christian schools in Thailand